Arne Kotte (20 March 1935 – 8 July 2015) was a Norwegian footballer who played as a forward.

He was active at club level in Norway and Italy, and he represented Norway at senior international level.

Career
Born in Steinkjer, Kotte played for Steinkjer, Vålerenga, Palermo and Frigg Oslo. He started his career with Steinkjer, before moving to Oslo in the summer of 1952 where he joined Vålerenga. He played three seasons for the Oslo club before returning to Steinkjer in the summer of 1955.

On 12 August 1956, Kotte signed a professional contract with Italian team Palermo. By doing so he became the first professional footballer from Steinkjer to play abroad. However, he suffered a knee injury five minutes into his first Palermo training match, which put him out of action for six months. He was eventually released by the club due to them filling their quota of foreign players after they signed Argentine Santiago Vernazza as a replacement for him. He had a trial with Spanish club Barcelona in the autumn of 1957, where he played three friendly matches, but the trial spell was cut short because of the knee injury, and he was not offered a contract by Barcelona.

Kotte returned to Norway in late 1957, and subsequently joined Frigg ahead of the 1958 season. He played three seasons for the Oslo club before once again moving back to Steinkjer, where he played out the remainder of his career before retiring as a player in 1965.

He won 19 international caps for Norway between 1953 and 1961, scoring three goals. One of his caps was earned in a FIFA World Cup qualifying match. He also played for Norway at under-21 and B level.

Later life and death
After retiring from playing in 1965, Kotte was active as a coach and referee. Kotte died in Steinkjer on 8 July 2015.

Career statistics

International goals

References

External links 
 

1935 births
2015 deaths
People from Steinkjer
Norwegian footballers
Norway under-21 international footballers
Norway international footballers
Steinkjer FK players
Vålerenga Fotball players
Palermo F.C. players
Frigg Oslo FK players
Association football forwards
Norwegian expatriate footballers
Norwegian expatriate sportspeople in Italy
Expatriate footballers in Italy
Sportspeople from Trøndelag